Ian McMullin (born 1 September 1964) is a former Australian rules footballer who played in the VFL/AFL.

McMullin, an ex-Old Melbournian footballer, was recruited by Collingwood in the 1980s. As a half-forward he was a noted goal-kicker. In 1987 he was delisted from Collingwood. McMullin was drafted by Essendon in the 1990 Pre-Season Draft. After a few years at the Bombers, Collingwood showed interest once again, drafting him in the 1992 Mid-Season Draft, but McMullin only played another year; McMullin was released by Collingwood in 1993, after playing one game.

External links

1964 births
Living people
Collingwood Football Club players
Essendon Football Club players
Old Melburnians Football Club players
Australian rules footballers from Victoria (Australia)
Victorian State of Origin players